Jorhat Town railway station is a railway station in Jorhat district, Assam. Its code is JTTN and it serves Jorhat City. Jorhat Town Railway station consists of two platforms.  (MXN), the biggest railway junction of the district which is 16 km away from the city.

The station lies on the Furkating–Mariani branch line via Jorhat and it is part of Tinsukia railway division of Northeast Frontier Railway zone.

Trains 

 Jorhat Town–Tinsukia Passenger
 Guwahati–Mariani Intercity Express
 Guwahati–Dibrugarh Intercity Express
 Dimapur–Mariani Passenger
 Guwahati–Jorhat Town Jan Shatabdi Express
 BG Express

References

Transport in Jorhat
Railway stations in Jorhat district
Tinsukia railway division